Yadollah Samadi ((17 November 1952  – 25 September 2018) was an Iranian film director. He was known for directing the film Desire to Fly.

References

External links
 
 Yadollah Samadi in Internet database of Soureh Cinema

People from Maragheh
1951 births
2018 deaths
Iranian film directors
Iranian screenwriters
Crystal Simorgh for Best Director winners
Producers who won the Best Film Crystal Simorgh
Crystal Simorgh for Best Screenplay winners